The Strathmerton Football Netball Club, nicknamed the Bulldogs, is an Australian rules football and netball club that was established in 1894 and has been affiliated with the Picola & District Football League since 1994.

The club is based in the small Victorian town of Strathmerton at the local Recreation Reserve  and fields four football teams and seven netball teams.

In 1947, the club unveiled a Roll of Honour of club footballers who enlisted for active service abroad in World War II.

Football Leagues
 Murray Border Football Association
1896
 Federal District Football Association
1897 to 1902
 Goulburn Valley Football Association
1903
1904 to 1910 – (Northern Division)
 Strathmerton Football Club
 1911 to 1912 – Club in recess
 Goulburn Valley Football Association
1913 to 1914
 Strathmerton Football Club 
 1915 to 1918 – Club in recess. World War I
 Goulburn Valley Football Association
 1919 to 1920 – (Northern Division)
 1921 to 1930
 Murray Football League
1931 to 1935
 Picola & District Football League
1936 to 1937
 Murray Football League
1938 to 1993
 Picola & District Football League
1994 to 2020

Football Premierships
Senior Football
Federal District Football Association
1899, 1900 
Picola & District Football League
1936, 1937, 1997, 2010, 2015, 2019
Murray Football League
1956, 1964

Reserves Football
?

Football Runners Up
Senior Football
Federal District Football Association
 1902
Murray Football League
 1931, 1960, 1975
Picola & District Football League
 2013, 2014, 2016, 2017
Reserves Football
?

League Best & Fairest Winners
Senior Football
Murray Football League – O'Dwyer Medal
 1956 – Len Carter 
 1957 – J J Ryan
 1958 – J J Ryan
 1959 – J J Ryan
 1963 – J J Ryan
 1964 – J J Ryan
 1966 – Norm Smith
 1973 – R Dunn
 1984 – C Bell
 1988 – C Newell

Strathmerton FC players who played in the VFL
The following footballers played with Strathmerton FC, prior to playing senior football in the VFL, with the year indicating their VFL debut.
 1950 – Frank Tuck – Collingwood
 1957 – Len Carter – Hawthorn
 1965 – Daryl Mares – Hawthorn
 1967 – Norm Smith – Hawthorn
 1969 – Pat Patterson – Geelong
 1981 – Stephen Reynoldson – Geelong & Brisbane Bears
 1987 – Scott Christie – North Melbourne. 1987 VFL Draft, pick 17. No senior VFL/AFL  games.

VFL / AFL footballers who have come to play at the Strathmerton FC
The following footballers have come to play with Strathmerton FC, with senior football experience from an VFL / AFL club. The year indicates their debut with Strathmerton FC.
 1950s – Jim McColl – Essendon
 1964 – Lance Oswald – St. Kilda
 1990s – Darren McAsey – Sydney Swans
 1990s – David Bolton – Sydney Swans

References

External links
 Strathmerton FNC Facebook
 Gameday website
  Strathmerton FC World War II Roll of Honour

Picola & District Football League clubs
Australian rules football clubs in Victoria (Australia)
1894 establishments in Australia
Australian rules football clubs established in 1894